Evje is the administrative centre of Evje og Hornnes municipality in Agder county, Norway. The village is located along the river Otra. Historically, the village of Evje was the administrative centre of the municipality of Evje og Vegusdal from 1838 until 1877, then from 1877 until 1960 it was the administrative centre of the municipality of Evje, and since then it has been the centre of Evje og Hornnes municipality.

Hornnes Church is actually located in the small village of Hornnes which is considered a part of the Evje urban area. Other villages in the urban area of Evje include Evjemoen, Dåsnesmoen, Hornnes, and Kjetså.

Name
The municipality (originally the parish) of Evje is named after an old Evje farm (Old Norse: Efja), since the first church was built there. The name is identical with the word efja which means "eddy".

References

Villages in Agder
Evje og Hornnes